This is a list of films produced in Venezuela.

Early film

1940s

1950s

1960s

1970s

1980s

1990s

2000s

2010s

2020s

See also
Cinema of Venezuela
List of South American films
List of Caribbean films

References

External links
 List of Venezuelan Movies on IMDb

Venezuela
Films